Rimantė Valiukaitė (born 5 March 1970) is a Lithuanian actress. She has finished Vilnius 54th High School. During 1988–1992 she studied acting in Lithuania music academy (course director Jonas Vaitkus). In 1990 she started working in Lithuania National Drama Theatre.

Filmography

Theatre

Awards and nominations

References

External links

1970 births
Living people
Actresses from Vilnius
Lithuanian film actresses
Lithuanian television actresses
21st-century Lithuanian actresses